Blues festivals are music festivals which focus on blues music. Blues is a genre and musical form that originated in African-American communities in the Southern United States around the end of the 19th century. It has elements of traditional African music, American folk music, spirituals, work songs, field hollers, shouts and chants, and rhymed simple narrative ballads. Blues has since evolved from  unaccompanied vocal music and oral traditions of slaves into a wide variety of styles and subgenres, such as country blues, Delta and Piedmont, Chicago, West Coast blues. World War II marked the transition from acoustic to electric blues and the progressive opening of blues music to a wider audience, especially white listeners.

List of blues festivals

North America

Canada

United States

Oceania

Asia

Europe

See also

References

 
Blues